The 2008 Delaware Fightin' Blue Hens football team represented the University of Delaware as a member of the South Division of the Colonial Athletic Association (CAA) during the 2008 NCAA Division I FCS football season. Led by seventh-year head coach K. C. Keeler, the Fightin' Blue Hens compiled an overall record of 4–8 with a mark of 2–6 in conference play, placing fifth in place in the CAA's South Division. The team played home games at Delaware Stadium in Newark, Delaware. The 2008 season proved to be one of Delaware's worst seasons in its 117-year history. It was the first, still only season, in which the Blue Hens lost eight games.

Schedule

Game summaries

Maryland

West Chester

Furman

Albany

UMass

Maine

William & Mary

Hofstra

James Madison

Towson

Richmond

Villanova

References

Delaware
Delaware Fightin' Blue Hens football seasons
Delaware Fightin' Blue Hens football